Sue Kaufman (August 7, 1926 – June 25, 1977) was an American author best known for the novel Diary of a Mad Housewife.

Biography 
Kaufman was born in Long Island, New York. She received her degree from Vassar College in 1947. In 1953, she married a doctor named Jeremiah Abraham Barondess, with whom she had a son. At Vassar, she did some editorial work. Her works appeared in The Atlantic Monthly, The Paris Review, and The Saturday Evening Post. Her first novel came out in 1959. In 1967, she wrote Diary of a Mad Housewife, which was adapted as a movie in 1970. She died in Manhattan in 1977 at the age of 50 after a long illness. The Sue Kaufman Prize for First Fiction is named in her honor.

Bibliography 
The Happy Summer Days (1959)
Green Holly (1961)
Diary of a Mad Housewife (1967)
The Headshrinker's Test (1969)
Falling Bodies (1974)
The Master and Other Stories (1976)

References 

American women novelists
American women short story writers
People from Long Island
Vassar College alumni
1926 births
1977 deaths
Writers from New York City
20th-century American novelists
20th-century American women writers
20th-century American short story writers
Novelists from New York (state)